The 2023 Volta ao Algarve (English: Tour of the Algarve) was a road cycling stage race that took place between 15 and 19 February 2023 in the Algarve region of southern Portugal. The race was rated as a category 2.Pro event on the 2023 UCI ProSeries calendar, and was the 49th edition of the Volta ao Algarve.

Teams 
12 of the 18 UCI WorldTeams, four UCI ProTeams, and nine UCI Continental teams made up the 25 teams that participated in the race.  were the only team not to enter a full squad of seven riders.

UCI WorldTeams

 
 
 
 
 
 
 
 
 
 
 
 

UCI ProTeams

 
 
 
 

UCI Continental Teams

 
 
 
 Efapel Cycling

Route

Stages

Stage 1 
15 February 2023 – Portimão to Lagos,

Stage 2 
16 February 2023 – Sagres to Alto da Fóia,

Stage 3 
17 February 2023 – Faro to Tavira,

Stage 4 
18 February 2023 – Albufeira to Alto do Malhão,

Stage 5 
19 February 2023 – Lagoa to Lagoa,  (ITT)

Classification leadership table

Final classification standings

General classification

Points classification

Mountains classification

Young rider classification

Team classification

References

Sources

External links 
 

2023
Volta ao Algarve
Volta ao Algarve
Volta ao Algarve